Jacqueline Chevé (21 August 1961 – 15 March 2010) was a member of the Senate of France.  She represented the Côtes-d'Armor department, and was a member of the Socialist Party.

References
Page on the Senate website

1961 births
2010 deaths
French Senators of the Fifth Republic
Socialist Party (France) politicians
Women members of the Senate (France)
Senators of Côtes-d'Armor